The 1897 Lafayette football team represented Lafayette College in the 1897 college football season. Lafayetted shut out eight opponents and finished with a 9–2–1 record in their first year under head coach Parke H. Davis. Significant games included victories over Penn State (24–0) and Lehigh (34–0 and 22–0), a 4–4 tie with Cornell, and losses to Princeton (0–57) and Penn (0–46).  The 1895 Lafayette team outscored its opponents by a combined total of 256 to 113.

Three Lafayette players received recognition on the 1897 College Football All-America Team. They are: guard Charles Rinehart (Walter Camp, 2nd team, Outing magazine, 1st team); halfback George B. Walbridge (Camp, 3rd team); and fullback Edward G. Bray (Outing, 2nd team).

Schedule

References

Lafayette
Lafayette Leopards football seasons
Lafayette football